Catherine Martine Denguiadé became Catherine Bokassa (born 7 August 1949) is a Central African former member of the royal family and the widow of Jean-Bédel Bokassa. She was one of several wives of Emperor Bokassa but she became the Empress when he created the Central African Empire. Her son was chosen as his heir apparent.

Life

Denguiadé was born in Sarh in Chad. Her father was from the CAR but her mother was from Chad and that was where she began her education. Her secondary education was in Bangui.

She married when she was fourteen. She was kidnapped by Bokassa to become his third wife. He would later marry fourteen other women.

She was involved in some way in 1977 when her husband's fall from power began. He issued a decree to say that every child attending school in his empire should wear a school uniform. It then appeared that Denguiadé owned the company that made the uniforms. In December 1977 her husband decreed himself Emperor of Central Africa and the Central African Republic became the Central African Empire. He chose to crown Catherine as Empress Consort and she was in an outfit by French fashion house Lanvin (company). Many of the extravagant items required for the coronation were imported from France. The French President sent eight horses from Normandy to pull their coach. In the event two of the horses died and the couple had to use a car. Her four year old son Jean-Bédel Bokassa Jr. attended the ceremony as the heir apparent. He was named crown prince (prince héritier de Centrafrique). Her son had elder brothers and half-brothers. One of her son's half brothers, Georges, was made a cabinet minister but her husband said he was not strong enough to be an heir.

In 1979 she was in Geneva living in exile with her and the ex-Emperor's seven children. She was said to sell a diamond every time she was short of money.

After Bokassa died she was supported by friends. In time both she and her children returned to the Central African Republic.

Honours

National honours 

  Dame Grand Cordon of the Imperial Order of Bokassa (4 December 1977).

References

1949 births
Living people
People from Sarh
Central African Republic politicians
Chadian women
Empresses
House of Bokassa